Malachi Kirby is a British actor and writer. He gained prominence through his roles in the 2016 Roots remake and the Black Mirror episode "Men Against Fire". He won a BAFTA for his performance in Small Axe: Mangrove (2020).

Early life
Kirby grew up an only child on the Patmore Estate in Battersea. His father died when he was 6. His parents were born in London where his grandparents had arrived from Jamaica. The cast of Roots were invited to take DNA tests, and Kirby's results came up as mostly West African with some South Asian and a small amount European. He stated he hopes to do more specific research.

Kirby attended Southfields Academy. Originally into literature, he discovered acting in year nine through a course at the Battersea Arts Centre. He studied at Richmond upon Thames College and was admitted to Identity School of Acting in 2007.

Career
Kirby began his career in theatre, and describes himself as a theatre actor "at heart". He was shortlisted for Outstanding Newcomer at the 2011 Evening Standard Theatre Awards after appearing in a production of Mogadishu. He also appeared in a number of television shows and films, including a stint on EastEnders and the lead in the television film My Murder. He was named a Screen International Star of Tomorrow in 2013.

In 2016, Kirby starred as Kunta Kinte in the American miniseries Roots, a remake of the 1977 miniseries of the same name. His performance was well received by critics. That October, Kirby starred in an episode of the anthology series Black Mirror entitled "Men Against Fire", directed by Jakob Verbruggen.

He won the Rising Star and Male TV Performance awards at the 2016 and 2017 Screen Nation Film and Television Awards respectively. For Roots, he also received nominations at the 2017 Black Reel Awards and NAACP Image Awards.

Kirby went on to star as Michael Garwick in the 2019 Sky One dystopian drama Curfew and Oliver Harris in the Italian series Devils. He penned his first play Level Up, which first premiered at the Bush Theatre in 2019.

Kirby landed the role of Darcus Howe in the "Mangrove" installment of Steve McQueen's Small Axe anthology, which premiered in 2020. It was the first time he got to play an explicitly Caribbean character. For his performance, he won the 2021 British Academy Television Award for Best Supporting Actor.

In September 2021, it was announced Kirby would star opposite Delroy Lindo as both of Mr. Nancy's sons Charlie and Spider in the Amazon Prime adaptation of Neil Gaiman's Anansi Boys''.

Personal life
Kirby was not raised religious and became so as an adult; he belongs to a Christian fellowship in East London.

Filmography

Film

Television

Video games

Awards and nominations

References

External links 
 

Living people
21st-century English male actors
Best Supporting Actor BAFTA Award (television) winners
Black British male actors
English Christians
English male television actors
English male film actors
English people of Jamaican descent
People from Battersea
Year of birth missing (living people)